The Beatrice Chautauqua Pavilion and Gatehouse is a historic structure in Beatrice, Nebraska. The pavilion was built in 1889 for the Chautauqua movement, which held meetings in Beatrice until 1916. The gatehouse, designed in the Gothic Revival architectural style, was moved to its current location after 1916, and the porch was added circa 1920. The structure has been listed on the National Register of Historic Places since April 9, 1979.

References

National Register of Historic Places in Gage County, Nebraska
Gothic Revival architecture in Nebraska
Buildings and structures completed in 1889
1889 establishments in Nebraska
Chautauqua